Andrew Van Ginkel (born July 1, 1995) is an American football linebacker for the Miami Dolphins of the National Football League (NFL). He played college football at South Dakota before transferring to Wisconsin and was drafted by the Dolphins in the fifth round of the 2019 NFL Draft.

Amateur career
Van Ginkel attended Rock Valley Community High School in Rock Valley, Iowa, where he played football for the Nighthawks, a consolidated team shared with Boyden–Hull High School, as a quarterback. He did not participate in recruiting camps following his senior year of high school football, and did not attract attention from many large schools. Van Ginkel began his college career at University of South Dakota, where he played defensive end.  He played for one season but transferred to Iowa Western Community College following his freshman year because head coach Joe Glenn retired. At Iowa Western, Van Ginkel continued to play defensive end. He transferred to the University of Wisconsin and played linebacker for two seasons.

College statistics

Professional career

Van Ginkel was drafted by the Miami Dolphins in the fifth round, 151st overall, of the 2019 NFL Draft. He was placed on injured reserve on September 6, 2019. He was designated for return from injured reserve on November 13, 2019, and began practicing with the team again. He was activated on November 20, 2019. On November 1, 2020, against the Los Angeles Rams, Van Ginkel recovered a fumble lost by Jared Goff and returned it for a 78 yard touchdown during the 28–17 win. This was the second longest fumble return in Dolphins' team history.
In Week 11 against the Denver Broncos, Van Ginkel forced a fumble on running back Melvin Gordon at the goal line which was recovered by the Dolphins during the 20–13 loss.

References

External links
Miami Dolphins bio
South Dakota Coyotes bio
Wisconsin Badgers bio
College Stats from Sports-Reference

1995 births
Living people
People from Rock Valley, Iowa
Players of American football from Iowa
American people of Dutch descent
American football linebackers
American football defensive ends
South Dakota Coyotes football players
Iowa Western Reivers football players
Wisconsin Badgers football players
Miami Dolphins players